Robert Gould (also credited as Bob Gould) is an American art director. He was nominated for an Academy Award in the category Best Art Direction for the film The Artist. The son of director Charles S. Gould, Robert Gould is credited with work on over 100 films and television series'.

Select filmography
Flight 7500 (2014)
The Artist (2011)
The Expendables (2010) (credited as Bob Gould)
Angels & Demons (2009)
Live Free or Die Hard (2007)
Poseidon (2006)
Master and Commander: The Far Side of the World (2003) 
Starship Troopers (1997) (credited as Bob Gould)
Demolition Man (1993)
Cliffhanger (1993) (credited as Bob Gould)
Total Recall (1990)
Leviathan  (1989)
RoboCop (1987)
Cobra  (1986)
Commando  (1985)
St. Elmo's Fire (1985)
The Postman Always Rings Twice (1981)
Carrie (1976)

Awards
2012 Academy Award for Best Art Direction for The Artist (co-nominated with Laurence Bennett)
2012 BAFTA Award for Best Production Design for The Artist (nominated) 
2010 ADG Excellence in Production Design Award for Angels & Demons (nominated)
2004 Academy Award for Best Art Direction for Master and Commander: The Far Side of the World (co-nominated with William Sandell)
2004 Satellite Award for Best Art Direction and Production Design Master and Commander: The Far Side of the World (nominated)

References

External links

Living people
American art directors
Place of birth missing (living people)
1940s births